Javier Monsálvez Carazo (born 8 October 1985), commonly known as Yuma, is a Spanish professional footballer who plays as a central midfielder for USL Championship club El Paso Locomotive FC, where he also is captain.

Club career
Born in Madrid, Yuma finished his development with local Rayo Vallecano, making his senior debut with the reserves in 2004–05, in Tercera División. In the same season he also appeared with the main squad in the Segunda División B and, in summer 2005, he was loaned to CF Fuenlabrada also in that level.

Yuma returned to Rayo in 2006, but struggled to appear regularly for the side, only contributing 20 starts over two seasons and being promoted in the second. He made his professional debut on 25 October that year, playing the entire 1–1 home draw against RCD Espanyol in the round of 32 of the Copa del Rey. His maiden Segunda División appearance came nearly two years later, in a 2–1 win over Deportivo Alavés also at the Campo de Fútbol de Vallecas.

After featuring sparingly in the following two seasons (being restricted due to injuries), Yuma left the Franjirrojos in June 2011. He signed with UD Salamanca shortly after, returning to the third division.

Yuma continued to compete in the third tier subsequently, representing Ontinyent CF and CD Puerta Bonita. On 24 March 2016, the 30-year-old moved abroad for the first time in his career after agreeing to a contract with North American Soccer League club Rayo OKC.

On 30 January 2017, Yuma signed for Puerto Rico FC in the same country and division. The competition was put on hiatus at the end of the campaign, and in February 2018 he joined Jacksonville Armada FC who had moved to the National Premier Soccer League. 

In December 2018, Yuma was one of three players who moved with coach Mark Lowry to new USL Championship team El Paso Locomotive FC. Ahead of the 2021 campaign, he was named their captain. 

Yuma was retained for the 2023 season, aged 37.

References

External links

1985 births
Living people
Spanish footballers
Footballers from Madrid
Association football midfielders
Segunda División players
Segunda División B players
Tercera División players
Rayo Vallecano B players
Rayo Vallecano players
CF Fuenlabrada footballers
UD Salamanca players
Ontinyent CF players
North American Soccer League players
USL Championship players
Rayo OKC players
Puerto Rico FC players
Jacksonville Armada FC players
El Paso Locomotive FC players
Spanish expatriate footballers
Expatriate footballers in Puerto Rico
Expatriate soccer players in the United States
Spanish expatriate sportspeople in Puerto Rico
Spanish expatriate sportspeople in the United States